The Rolls-Royce Silver Ghost name refers both to a car model and one specific car from that series.

Originally named the "40/50 h.p." the chassis was first made at Royce's Manchester works, with production moving to Derby in July 1908, and also, between 1921 and 1926, in Springfield, Massachusetts. Chassis no. 60551, registered AX 201, was the car that was originally given the name "Silver Ghost." Other 40/50 hp cars were also given names, but the Silver Ghost title was taken up by the press, and soon all 40/50s were called by the name, a fact not officially recognised by Rolls-Royce until 1925, when the Phantom range was launched.

The Silver Ghost was the origin of Rolls-Royce's claim of making the "best car in the world" – a phrase coined not by themselves, but by the prestigious publication Autocar in 1907.

The chassis and engine were also used as the basis of a range of Rolls-Royce Armoured Cars.

In December of 1923, four friends of Woodrow Wilson chipped in to buy the former President a Silver Ghost, just weeks before Wilson's death in February of 1924.  The car was modified so that Wilson, who was disabled, could enter and exit the car more easily.

History

In 1906, Rolls-Royce produced four chassis to be shown at the Olympia car show, two existing models, a four-cylinder 20 hp and a six-cylinder 30 hp, and two examples of a new car designated the 40/50 hp. The 40/50 hp was so new that the show cars were not fully finished, and examples were not provided to the press for testing until March 1907.

The car at first had a new side-valve, six-cylinder, 7036 cc engine (7428 cc from 1910) with the cylinders cast in two units of three cylinders each as opposed to the triple two-cylinder units on the earlier six. A three-speed transmission was fitted at first with four-speed units used from 1913. The seven-bearing crankshaft had full pressure lubrication, and the centre main bearing was made especially large to remove vibration, essentially splitting the engine into two three-cylinder units. Two spark plugs were fitted to each cylinder with, from 1921, a choice of magneto or coil ignition. The earliest cars had used a trembler coil to produce the spark with a magneto as an optional extra which soon became standard - the instruction was to start the engine on the trembler/battery and then switch to magneto. Electric lighting became an option in 1914 and was standardised in 1919. Electric starting was fitted from 1919 along with electric lights to replace the older ones that used acetylene or oil.

Development of the Silver Ghost was suspended during World War I, although the chassis and engine were supplied for use in Rolls-Royce Armoured Cars. A blue 1909 Silver Ghost known as Blue Mist, previously owned by an Irish lord, was used by Lawrence of Arabia as his personal staff car during the Arab Revolt. Construction of a replica Blue Mist began in 2018.

The chassis had rigid front and rear axles and leaf springs all round. Early cars only had brakes on the rear wheels operated by a hand lever, with a pedal-operated transmission brake acting on the propellor shaft. The footbrake system moved to drums on the rear axle in 1913. Four-wheel servo-assisted brakes became optional in 1923.

Despite these improvements the performance of the Silver Ghost's competitors had improved to the extent that its previous superiority had been eroded by the early 1920s. Sales declined from 742 in 1913 to 430 in 1922. The company decided to launch its replacement which was introduced in 1925 as the New Phantom. After this, older 40/50 models were called Silver Ghosts to avoid confusion.

A total of 7874 Silver Ghost cars were produced from 1907 to 1926, including 1701 from the American Springfield factory. The documented chassis price listed for the 1921 American version was US$11,750 ($ in  dollars ). Many of them still run today. A fine example is on display at the National Motor Museum, Beaulieu.

The Alpine Eagles
A 40/50 was privately entered in the prestigious 1912 Austrian Alpine Trial by James Radley, but its 3-speed gearbox proved inadequate for the ascent of the Katschberg Pass. The team gained six awards including the Archduke Leopold Cup. Replicas of the victorious cars were put into production and sold officially as Continental models, but they were called Alpine Eagles by chief test driver (and later Rolls-Royce Managing Director) Ernest Hives, and this is the name that they have kept.

The Silver Ghost
In 1907 Claude Johnson, commercial and managing director of Rolls-Royce, ordered a car to be used as a demonstrator by the company. With chassis no. 60551 and registered AX 201, it was the 12th 40/50 hp to be made, and was painted in aluminium paint with silver-plated fittings. The car was named the "Silver Ghost" to emphasise its ghost-like quietness, and a plaque bearing this name adorned the bulkhead. An open-top Roi-des-Belges body by coachbuilder Barker was fitted, and the car readied for the Scottish reliability trials of 1907 and, immediately afterwards, another  test which included driving between London and Glasgow 27 times.

The aim was to raise public awareness of the new company and to show the reliability and quietness of their new car. This was a risky idea: cars of this time were notoriously unreliable, and roads of the day could be horrendous. Nevertheless, the car set off on trials, and with press aboard, broke various records. Even after 7,000 miles (11,000 km), the cost to service the car was a negligible £2 2s 7d (£2.13). The reputation of the 40/50, and Rolls-Royce, was established.

AX201 was sold in 1908 to a private customer, who used it for his annual holiday to Italy, and recovered by the company in 1948. Since then, it has been used as a publicity car and travelled worldwide. In 1991, the car was restored.

In 2005 it was noted to be the world's most valuable car, its insured value was placed at US$35 million.

After the 1998 sale of Rolls-Royce Motors Ltd the car passed into the ownership of Bentley Motors.

Gallery

See also

 Rolls-Royce Armoured Car

References

Notes

Bibliography

External links

 "Ambassador Extraordinary - A History of 'The Silver Ghost'", reprint from Queste, 1990
 Rolls-Royce and Bentley Models

Silver Ghost
Vehicles introduced in 1906
1900s cars
1910s cars
1920s cars